Georgia is a 1995 American independent film starring Jennifer Jason Leigh and Mare Winningham. Leigh plays Sadie Flood, a punky barroom singer who has a complicated relationship with her older sister, Georgia, played by Winningham. 

Georgia won the Grand Prix of the Americas Award for Best Picture at the Montreal World Film Festival. Leigh received Best Actress honors at the Montreal World Film Festival and the New York Film Critics Circle for her performance, while Winningham received an Independent Spirit Award for Best Supporting Actress as well as Best Supporting Actress nominations at the Academy Awards and from the Screen Actors Guild.

Plot 
Georgia Flood is a successful, talented and well-adjusted folk music singer who is happily married and a mother of two. Her younger sister Sadie is passionate but self-destructive and lacking in technical skill. She tries to match Georgia's accomplishments by becoming the lead singer for a punk rock band, but is unsuccessful and destroys herself through drug abuse. Sadie comes to Georgia seeking help after she ends a relationship. An initially reluctant Georgia tries to help her sister out of a continued downward spiral.

Cast

Production
The film was a highly personal project for Jennifer Jason Leigh. Leigh's mother, Barbara Turner, wrote the screenplay; Leigh and Turner co-produced it along with director Ulu Grosbard, and Mare Winningham, a longtime friend who had been Leigh's camp counselor during their teen years, co-starred.

The music in the film consists of 13 songs; to create a realistic effect, Leigh and Winningham were both filmed singing live. The 13 songs included covers of songs by Gladys Knight & the Pips, Elvis Costello and Van Morrison. In the talked-about centerpiece of the film, Sadie drunkenly performs a raw, grueling cover of Morrison's "Take Me Back" in a ragged Janis Joplin-style gut howl at an AIDS benefit concert.

John Doe of the band X plays a supporting role and performed as a member of Sadie's band.

Reception

Release 
Georgia was screened in the Un Certain Regard section at the 1995 Cannes Film Festival. Georgia was released in the U.S. on December 8, 1995. The film performed poorly at the U.S. box office.

Home media 
On February 15, 2000, the film was released by Miramax Classics on DVD. It was re-released on DVD on May 17, 2011.

Critical reception 
On review aggregate website Rotten Tomatoes, Georgia has an approval rating of 81% based on 26 reviews. 

Susan Wloszczyna of USA Today described the film as "a painful though sadly humorous portrait of sisterhood". In a 3.5/4-star review, Roger Ebert said Georgia "is not a simply plotted movie about descent and recovery, but a complex, deeply knowledgeable story about how alcoholism and mental illness really are family diseases; Sadie's sickness throws everybody off, and their adjustments to it don't make them healthier people." 

James Berardinelli of ReelViews praised it as “a tour de force for Leigh... there are times when it's uncomfortable to watch this performance because it's so powerful”, adding “Georgia doesn't possess an amazingly original narrative, but what distinguishes this picture is the depth of the characters and the amazing power with which the two leads breathe life into them.” Kenneth Turan of the Los Angeles Times wrote that “Leigh’s exceptional performance tears you apart… we’ve never seen anything like it before”, adding that "Georgia is not an easy film, but in the American independent arena, it outperforms everything in sight.” Barbara Shulgasser of the San Francisco Examiner wrote, "What Leigh succeeds at conveying so well is the desperation of a young woman whose passion for art exceeds her capacity to express herself artistically...Because of [her] powerful performance we glean that Georgia' is really not about drug abuse or sibling rivalry, or the frustration of the untalented...but about talent [itself]."

Jennifer Jason Leigh was voted the year's Best Actress by the New York Film Critics Circle and at the Montreal World Film Festival, nominated for an Independent Spirit Award, and was widely predicted to receive her first Oscar nomination for the role. However, it was Mare Winningham who received an Oscar nomination (as well as an Independent Spirit Award and Screen Actors Guild nomination) as Best Supporting Actress, while Leigh was overlooked by the Academy of Motion Picture Arts and Sciences. Speaking to MetroActive magazine, Winningham said: “I felt incredibly honored and touched to be nominated...But it was hard to be separated from Jennifer, because she was the heart and soul of that film. While we were making the movie, I thought not only that she would get a nomination, but that she would win. I saw the kind of work she was doing. In my mind she will always be the greatest performance of that year, and a lot of other people thought so, too. Meryl Streep grabbed me at the Academy Awards. She said, 'Jennifer should be here!' and I said, 'I know!'”

In a 2018 essay for Sight & Sound, Brad Stevens wrote of the film: "What makes this film so endlessly fascinating is its refusal to impose a definitive reading. Is Sadie a talentless amateur leeching off her sister’s talent? Or is she the voice of raw authenticity, her harsh vocal delivery a critique of Georgia’s soulless professionalism? [Ulu] Grosbard does not say, leaving us to fall back on our own judgement."

In 2020, USA Today named Georgia'' in the number 17 spot on its list of the 24 best films for country music fans.

Awards and nominations
 Academy Awards: Mare Winningham, Best Actress in a Supporting Role (nomination)
 New York Film Critics Circle: Jennifer Jason Leigh, Best Actress (won) Montreal World Film Festival: Grand Prix of the Americas for Best Picture (won) Montreal World Film Festival: Jennifer Jason Leigh, Best Actress (won) Screen Actors Guild: Mare Winningham, Best Supporting Actress (nomination)
 Independent Spirit Awards: Ulu Grosbard, Best Director (nomination)
 Independent Spirit Awards: Mare Winningham, Best Supporting Female (won)'''
 Independent Spirit Awards: Jennifer Jason Leigh, Best Female Lead (nomination)
 Independent Spirit Awards: Max Perlich, Best Supporting Male (nomination)

References

External links

1995 films
1995 drama films
1995 independent films
American drama films
American independent films
Films about heroin addiction
Films about singers
Films about music and musicians
Films about entertainers
Films about sisters
Films directed by Ulu Grosbard
Miramax films
1990s English-language films
1990s American films